The 30th Pennsylvania House of Representatives District is a electoral district in southwestern Pennsylvania that has been represented by Democrat Arvind Venkat since 2023.

District profile 
The 30th Pennsylvania House of Representatives District is located in Allegheny County and includes the following areas:

Ben Avon
Ben Avon Heights
Emsworth
Franklin Park
 Hampton Township (part)
District 03 
District 04 
District 05 
District 12 
District 13
Kilbuck Township
McCandless
Ohio Township

Representatives

Recent election results

References

External links 

 District map from the United States Census Bureau
 Pennsylvania House Legislative District Maps from the Pennsylvania Redistricting Commission.
 Population Data for District 30 from the Pennsylvania Redistricting Commission.

Government of Allegheny County, Pennsylvania
30